Gochon Station is a station of the Busan Metro Line 4 in Cheolma-myeon, Gijang County, Busan, South Korea. This station name comes from Gochon-ri, Cheolma-myeon.

Station Layout

Gallery

Vicinity
 Exit 1: GS Gas Station
 Exit 2: Bus Stop

External links

  Cyber station information from Busan Transportation Corporation

Busan Metro stations
Gijang County
Railway stations opened in 2011